Psilogramma penumbra is a moth of the  family Sphingidae. It is known from the Northern Territory and Western Australia.

References

Psilogramma
Moths described in 2011
Endemic fauna of Australia